The 1969 Memphis State Tigers football team represented Memphis State University (now known as the University of Memphis) as an independent during the 1969 NCAA University Division football season. In its 12th season under head coach Billy J. Murphy, the team compiled an 8–2 record (4–0 against conference opponents), won the MVC championship, and outscored opponents by a total of 328 to 191. The team played its home games at Memphis Memorial Stadium in Memphis, Tennessee. 

The team's statistical leaders included Danny Pierce with 1,049 passing yards, Paul Gowen with 715 rushing yards, Frank Blackwell with 591 receiving yards, and Jay McCoy with 48 points scored.

Schedule

References

Memphis State
Memphis Tigers football seasons
Missouri Valley Conference football champion seasons
Memphis State Tigers football